Coronadite is a black monoclinic mineral containing a ternary oxide of lead and manganese in two oxidation states. The mineral was named after Francisco Vasquez de Coronado who was an explorer of southwest USA. The name was made up by Waldemar Lindgren in 1905.

References

Manganese minerals
Lead minerals